Eliot Chenaux born on April 11, 1947 in Honolulu, Hawaii, is a former academic and competitive swimmer who competed with the Puerto Rican team in the 1964 Summer Olympics.  He also swam for Puerto Rico in the Pan American Games in São Paulo in 1963 and in Winnipeg in 1967.

After earning a bachelor's degree in Philosophy and a doctorate in Hispanic Languages and Literature from St. Louis University, Chenaux moved in 1976 to Corpus Christi where he worked as a faculty, and in the latter part of his career as Vice President of Student Affairs at Texas A&M University–Corpus Christi. He retired in 2014.

References

1947 births
Living people
Puerto Rican male swimmers
Puerto Rican male freestyle swimmers
Male backstroke swimmers
Male medley swimmers
Olympic swimmers of Puerto Rico
Swimmers at the 1964 Summer Olympics
Central American and Caribbean Games gold medalists for Puerto Rico
Competitors at the 1966 Central American and Caribbean Games
Central American and Caribbean Games medalists in swimming
Swimmers at the 1963 Pan American Games
Swimmers at the 1967 Pan American Games
Pan American Games competitors for Puerto Rico